Sarah Ben-David is an Israeli Professor of Criminology whose scientific and public activity focuses mainly on victimology and criminology and overlapping areas between these two fields. In recent years, Ben-David has worked to encourage research, awareness and therapy in the field of sexual harassment of men and women, and regarding awareness of the reciprocal nature of intimate partner violence and domestic violence.

Biography
Sarah Ben-David began her undergraduate studies in Sociology and Economics at the Tel Aviv branch of the Hebrew University. She received her master's degree in education, graduating with honors from Tel Aviv University, and completed her doctoral studies at Bar-Ilan University. Upon completing her masters' studies, Ben-David became the coordinator of research in the Department of Criminology at the University of Tel Aviv, and in Mental Health Center in Ayalon Prison. She specialized and acquired experience in the treatment of offenders.

Activities
Ben-David's scientific publications and activities in the field gained her international recognition, and she was awarded a prize in August 2009 for her contribution to victimology, by the World Society of Victimology (WSV). In May of that year, Inter-University Center Dubrovnik awarded her a prize for her contribution to the field of victimology. Furthermore, she served on the board of the World Society of Victimology (WSV) since 1979 and was vice president of this organization for about 12 years, starting in 1997.

Her expertise in the treatment of sex offenders is also recognized and she was appointed official director of Danger Assessment by the Commission of the Ministry of Health. Ben-David served for number of years as chair of the Advisory Council to the Minister of Justice and Minister of Public Security, and today she is a member of the Steering Committee, and Chair of the Professional Committee, for the Day Center for Sex Offenders in the Community. Ben-David Served for several years as Head of Victimology Department in Bar-Ilan University, where she initiated and established the Social and Rehabilitative Track for the master's degree, a track that produces many of the graduates who are active in the field and in academia. She founded and led three organizations:

 Sha'al - victims' assistance service, an association founded in 1979 that was a pioneer in promoting the field of victim care.
 El'am - Sex Crime Prevention Association, an organization that promoted the professional treatment of sex offenders, and promoted legislation.
 Keleth - Criminologists for correctional services. In this association, Ben-David and her colleagues established the first center for sex offenders in the community.

In Ariel University Center of Samaria, Ben David was among the founders of the Department of Criminology and has served as head of the department since its establishment. The Department currently has about 300 students. Since 2010, the department has been conducting study days and editing a book on female criminality and female domestic violence.

Ben David pays great attention to training graduate students and to guiding graduate students in the masters' and doctoral degrees. She serves as a member of the editorial board in the Journal of Ethnicity in Criminal Justice and the Journal of Offender Therapy and Comparative Criminology, as a reviewer of articles in number of other journals, and as a judge of doctoral and masters' thesis projects.

She currently serves as Head of the Department of Criminology and is engaged in research in the field of family, women and crime and various approaches regarding the treatment for violence.

Conferences and publications in the field of domestic violence
In 2010, the criminology department under Prof. Ben-David began holding a series of conferences ("Pink Crime" on 30.5.11, "The Different Faces of Domestic Violence" on 21.11.11, and the international and interdisciplinary conference titled "Violence, Conflict and Unity in the Family: a re-examination of the treatment and judgment doctrines" planned for 29 and 30 April 2013). These conferences examine the phenomena of reciprocity in domestic violence, male victimhood, bias in research data in the field of domestic violence, the abuse suffered by men in divorce proceedings, false complaints about violence and sex crimes and more. Ben-David's partners and co-organizers in the conferences are - Dr. Sharon Aharoni-Goldberg of Netanya Academic College; Dr. Yoav Mazeh, Ono Academic College; Dr. Yael Aviad, Dr. Hagit Bonny-Noach and Dr. Inna Levy, all of Ariel University, and Gil Ronen, journalist and chairman of the Foundation for the Defense of Family ("The Familists").

Ben-David published an article entitled "The Feminization of Domestic Violence" in Crimoblog, the newsletter of the Association of Israeli Criminologists (January 2012), which claimed that: "Female violence in a relationship is not perceived as a real phenomenon and therefore rarely recognized and treated by the various authorities and social agencies."

The Department of Criminology under Prof. Ben-David, in collaboration with Dr. Yoav Mazeh of the Ono Academic College, is also working on a book called "Silent Violence" with Dr. Yael Aviad as the editor in chief. The book will address women's violence against men in relationships. In an interview with Gal Gabbai in the television program "Creating a New Order" on Israel Educational Television (19.11.2012) Ben-David pointed to the silencing of studies that contradict the claim that only men are violent in relationships, and noted that she even received threats before the "Pink Crime" conference: "We received threats that if we conduct the conference it will be disrupted by force, protests will be organized, etc."

Day center for treatment of sex offenders in the community
Ben-David has worked in the field of offenders' treatment in researching and processing of scientific material, in order to obtain sponsorship and support for the establishment of a day center for sex offenders' treatment and research. The center currently operates under the Ministry of Social Affairs.

The establishment of the center was due to the understanding that treatment of sex offenders and the prevention of sex crimes are a vital social need, and that in order to protect society and provide alternative coping patterns for criminals, a solution within the community is necessary. The center is located in the central district of Israel and is designed to provide the population of men aged 18 and above who meet certain criteria and who committed sexual offenses, or offenses with a sexual nature. The center has operated since 2005 and provides a unique solution for sex offenders.

In recent years Ben-David and her colleagues are involved in planning a Center for Family Peace, which will provide courses and seminars for the community at large and to professionals; treatment and mediation for couples and children in families where there is a conflict, and research and teaching in the field of family violence and conflict mediation.

Studies

Ben-David has defined two new terms in the field of victimology - 'career victim' and 'victim dehumanization'. The first president of the World Society of Victimology, Prof. Hans Joachim Schneider, has also noted her contribution to the field. In the early 2000s, Ben-David developed and published a new theoretical approach to victimology - Normative Victimology or Victimology of the Victim.

The feminization of domestic violence
According to Prof. Ben-David, the way in which the issue of domestic violence is addressed is biased, and tends to undergo a process of "feminization". Ben-David points to many research findings that show that marital violence is not limited to male attackers and female victims. Rather, it is a mutual phenomenon, in which either the woman or the man can be the violent partner, while in other cases, both are victims and attackers at the same time. The perception that this is a collective phenomenon in which men, as a group, attack women, as a group, limits the legal and practical treatment of the subject only to spousal violence in which the man is the attacker.

Prof. Ben-David states that victimology literature has not paid due attention to the complexity of the phenomenon of violence in relationships, since the establishment of centers for assisting women and feminist publications have established the concept that women are always victims and men are always attackers. Nevertheless, when striving for a definition that is clean from value judgments, she says, it is difficult to define the victim in marital violence, because it is not always clear what started the violence, and the person injured is not always the true victim (violence could be the result of initiation, provocation or even assault by the injured party).

According to Ben-David, the social perception is still fixated upon the incorrect assumption that violence between partners stems from men who are trying to ensure their superiority and that female violence is always self-defense. She claims that the findings which point to the overlap between the victim and the perpetrator are ignored and silenced.

References

Living people
Israeli criminologists
Israeli women criminologists
Year of birth missing (living people)